During the 1986–87 English football season, Aston Villa competed in the Football League First Division and were relegated

Manager, Graham Turner, was sacked on 14 September 1986, just over two years after his appointment, as Villa were heading for relegation. Billy McNeill had started the 1986–87  English football season as manager of Manchester City, but quit in September 1986 to take charge of Villa. When Villa were relegated, after finishing bottom of the First Division in May 1987, McNeill stood down and was replaced by Graham Taylor. Manchester City were also relegated that season.

Diary of the season
1 Aug 1986 – Aston Villa signed midfielder Neale Cooper from Aberdeen for £350,000.

31 Aug 1986 – The bottom two places in the league were occupied by Manchester United and Aston Villa, who are yet to gain a point this season.

13 Sep 1986 – Bryan Robson made his first league appearance since April when he returns from a shoulder injury to help Manchester United record their first league win of the season at the fifth attempt as they beat Southampton 5–1 at Old Trafford and climb off the bottom of the First Division. Nottingham Forest go top with a 6–0 home win over Aston Villa.

14 Sep 1986 – Aston Villa sack manager Graham Turner after just over two years at the helm.

20 Sep 1986 – Newly promoted Norwich go second with a 4–1 win at Aston Villa. A nine-goal thriller at Leeds Road sees Huddersfield beat Oldham 5–4 in the Second Division.

22 Sep 1986 – Aston Villa appoint Billy McNeill as manager from Manchester City, who replace him with Jimmy Frizzell.

27 Sep 1986 – Aston Villa's first league match under Billy McNeill ends in a 3–3 draw with Liverpool at Anfield after the hosts come from behind twice to equalise.

30 Sep 1986 – Aston Villa still occupy bottom place and Manchester United are second from bottom with just four points so far this campaign.

31 Oct 1986 – As October ends, Manchester United and Aston Villa have both climbed out of the bottom two, ahead of Newcastle United, Manchester City and Chelsea.

29 Nov 1986 – Arsenal remain top with a 4–0 away win over Aston Villa.

13 Dec 1986 - Aston Villa come from 3-1 down in the final minutes to draw 3–3 with Manchester United in a First Division clash at Villa Park.

23 Dec 1986 – Tottenham Hotspur sign midfielder Steve Hodge from Aston Villa for £650,000.

27 Dec 1986 - Chelsea halt their dismal form with a 4–1 home win over Aston Villa.

1 Jan 1987 - Arsenal remain four points ahead at the top of the First Division with a 3–1 home win over Wimbledon, as Everton keep up the pressure with a 3–0 home win over Aston Villa.

24 Jan 1987 – Tottenham gain 3–0 home win over Aston Villa.

31 Jan 1987 – Aston Villa have slipped back into the relegation zone, joining Leicester City and Newcastle United.

19 Feb 1987 – Billy McNeill boosts Aston Villa's battle against relegation by paying Everton £300,000 for striker Warren Aspinall.

21 Feb 1987 – Liverpool miss the chance to go level on points at the top of the First Division when they are held to a 2–2 draw at Aston Villa.

4 Mar 1987 – Aston Villa miss the chance to climb out of the bottom four after Wimbledon hold them to a goalless draw at Villa Park.

7 Mar 1987 - Newcastle stay bottom of the table but boost their survival hopes with a 2–1 home win over an Aston Villa side who are now second from bottom.

21 Mar 1987 - The latest relegation crunch thriller sees Southampton beat Aston Villa 5–0 at The Dell.

25 Mar 1987 - Aston Villa drop two more points in their survival battle as they draw 1–1 at home to Watford. Leicester climb out of the bottom four with a 4–1 home win over QPR. Newcastle remain bottom after drawing 1–1 at home to Tottenham.

28 Mar 1987 – Manchester City crash to the bottom of the table with a 4–0 defeat against Leicester City at Filbert Street, which is a major boost for the home side's survival hopes. Aston Villa boost their own survival bid with a 1–0 home win over Coventry City. Newcastle climb off the bottom of the table with a 2–0 home win over Southampton.

2 Apr 1987 – Former Aston Villa and Wales midfielder Trevor Hockey dies of a heart attack at the age of 43 after collapsing during a charity football match in West Yorkshire.

4 Apr 1987 - First Division strugglers Aston Villa and Manchester City draw 0–0 at Villa Park. Newcastle's survival hopes are given a fresh boost as they beat Leicester City 2–0 at home. A seven-goal thriller at Selhurst Park sees Charlton beat Watford 4–3 to boost their survival bid.

18 Apr 1987 - Everton move closer to winning the First Division title with a 1–0 away win over Aston Villa, who are six points adrift of the relegation playoff place and seven points adrift of automatic survival with five games remaining.

20 Apr 1987 - A relegation crunch game at Selhurst Park sees Charlton boost their survival hopes by winning 3–0 against Aston Villa, whose survival hopes are left hanging by a thread.

25 Apr 1987 - Comprehensive victories for the bottom two of Aston Villa and Manchester City keeps the survival hopes of both clubs alive.

2 May 1987 - Aston Villa are left needing at least four points from their final two games after losing 2–1 to Arsenal at Highbury.

4 May 1987 – Aston Villa's relegation is confirmed as they lose 2–1 at home to Sheffield Wednesday.

8 May 1987 - Relegated Aston Villa sack Billy McNeill after eight months as manager.

18 May 1987 – Graham Taylor resigns after 10 years as Watford manager to succeed Billy McNeill at relegated Aston Villa. During his time at Watford, Taylor took the club from the Fourth Division to the First.

19 May 1987 – Aston Villa begin rebuilding following relegation with the sale of defender Tony Dorigo to Chelsea for £450,000.

League table

References

Aston Villa F.C. seasons
Aston Villa